White Rain is an American brand of body wash and hair care products owned by International Wholesale. It was introduced as a shampoo in 1952 by Alberto-Culver.

Ownership history

The Gillette Company sold the White Rain brand to Florida-based Diamond Products Company in April 2000.

In 2007, Sun Products acquired the brand from Diamond Products Company. 

In 2012, the brand was sold to High Ridge Brands, which owns other former brands of Alberto-Culver.

In February 2021, International Wholesale acquired the White Rain brand from High Ridge Brands.

References

External links

Products introduced in 1952
Hair care products
Personal care brands
Shampoo brands